Song Duk-ho is a South Korean actor. He is known for his roles in dramas such as Tracer, Moonshine, Hotel del Luna , Juvenile Justice, Taxi Driver and Link: Eat, Love, Kill. He also appeared in movies Secret Zoo, Sunset in My Hometown, Burning and What Happened to Mr. Cha?.

Filmography

Television series

Film

Music video appearances

Awards and nominations

References

External Links 
 
 

1993 births
21st-century South Korean male actors
Living people
South Korean male television actors
South Korean male film actors